Hempala Premachandra "Henry" Jayasuriya (born 1930) is a Sri Lankan boxer. He competed in the men's bantamweight event at the 1956 Summer Olympics. At the 1956 Summer Olympics, he lost to Robert Bath of Australia.

References

External links
 

1930 births
Living people
Sri Lankan male boxers
Olympic boxers of Sri Lanka
Boxers at the 1956 Summer Olympics
Place of birth missing (living people)
Asian Games medalists in boxing
Boxers at the 1954 Asian Games
Asian Games silver medalists for Sri Lanka
Medalists at the 1954 Asian Games
Bantamweight boxers